Sleepstalker (released in the Philippines as A Demon in the House) is a 1995 American horror film directed by Turi Meyer, written by Al Septien and Meyer, and starring Michael Harris, Jay Underwood, Kathryn Morris, and Michael D. Roberts.

Plot
Seventeen years after slaughtering all but one member of a family, "The Sandman" (Michael Harris) is pending execution. Before his execution the jailers allow a minister (Michael D. Roberts) to visit him. The minister is a voodoo priest and an ally of the prisoner, which the jailers did not realize. A hex is placed onto The Sandman, so that when his execution is over, his soul can travel to a new body made of sand, but all his blood relatives would need to die. The Sandman then plots to kill a young man named Griffin (Jay Underwood), who is his biological little brother, and additionally, a survivor of the abuse of their birth father. Griffin survived the attempted slaughter, but his adoptive parents did not. The Sandman is then reborn, upon execution, to have a chance to try once again.

Cast
 Michael Harris as The Sandman
Giuseppe Andrews as Young Sandman
 Jay Underwood as Griffin Davis
Vincent Barry as Young Griffin Davis
 Kathryn Morris as Megan
 Michael D. Roberts as The Preacher
 William Lucking as Detective Bronson Worth
 Kathleen McMartin as Dana
 A.J. Glassman as Kenny
 Peter Vasquez as 'Dog' Sanchez
 Ken Foree as Detective Rolands
 Christopher Boyer as Detective Garcia
 Angel Ashley as Cheryl
 Lenore Van Camp as Julia
 Marc McClure as Mr. Davis, Griffin's Father
 Caryn Richman as Mrs. Davis, Griffin's Mother
 Barry Lynch as Pierson, Prison Guard
 Michael Faella as Sandman's Father
 Lillian Hurst as Old Woman

Production
Prism Entertainment began pre-production of the film in 1994.

Release
Sleepstalker was released direct-to-video in 1995. In the Philippines, the film was released in theaters as A Demon in the House on April 27, 1995.

Reception
TV Guide rated it 2/5 stars and wrote, "Sleepstalker simultaneously demonstrates its director's cinematic finesse and frustration at being unable to transform a sow's ear screenplay."

References

External links

 

1995 films
1995 horror films
American slasher films
American supernatural horror films
Sandman in film
Films scored by Jimmy Manzie
1990s English-language films
1990s American films